The 1908 Canadian football season was the 17th season of organized play since the Canadian Rugby Union (CRU) was founded in 1892 and the 26th season since the creation of the Ontario Rugby Football Union (ORFU) and the Quebec Rugby Football Union (QRFU) in 1883. The season concluded with the Hamilton Tigers defeating the Toronto University team in the 1908 Dominion Championship game.

Canadian football news in 1908
The Calgary Rugby Foot-ball Club was re-organized as the Tigers on August 27 and adopted yellow and black as the team colours. 
The Calgary Rugby Football Union was formed on September 29 in the offices of the Sovereign Life Insurance Company. 
The Caledonia and Hillhurst Football Clubs play for the championship of the Central Alberta Rugby Football League on September 4. 
The Edmonton Rugby Foot-ball Club was renamed the Esquimoux on October 16. 
Goals from the Field were reduced to three points by the CRU.

Regular season

Final regular season standings
Note: GP = Games Played, W = Wins, L = Losses, T = Ties, PF = Points For, PA = Points Against, Pts = Points
*Bold text means that they have clinched the playoffs

League Champions

Playoffs

Saskatchewan Rugby Football League final

Regina wins SRFL championship total points series: 12-7

Calgary Rugby Football Union Final

Alberta Rugby Football League Playoffs

Edmonton wins the total-point series 18-3.

IRFU Final

Hamilton advances to the East Semi-Final.

CIRFU Final

Toronto advances to the Dominion Championship.

Dominion Semi-Final

Hamilton advances to the Dominion Championship.

Dominion Championship

References

 
Canadian Football League seasons